Gorseinon Hospital is a rehabilitation hospital in Gorseinon, Wales. It is managed by Swansea Bay University Health Board.

History
The hospital was established by William Rufus Lewis, proprietor of the local woolen mill firm of William Lewis & Sons, in 1936. It joined the National Health Service as a general hospital in 1948 but subsequently developed a large maternity department and became the Gorseinon General and Maternity Hospital. It specialised as a rehabilitation hospital in the early 1990s and then developed a treatment centre to help patients with Parkinson's disease in 2004.

References

Hospitals in Swansea
Hospitals established in 1936
NHS hospitals in Wales
1936 establishments in Wales
Swansea Bay University Health Board